Alain Quittet (born 8 August 1956) is a French sports shooter and former Paralympic road cyclist. He has won six medals at the UCI Para-cycling World Championships and a Paralympic bronze medalist.

References

External links
 
 

1956 births
Living people
People from Audincourt
Sportspeople from Doubs
Paralympic cyclists of France
Paralympic shooters of France
French male cyclists
French male sport shooters
Cyclists at the 2008 Summer Paralympics
Medalists at the 2008 Summer Paralympics
Shooters at the 2020 Summer Paralympics
Cyclists from Bourgogne-Franche-Comté
20th-century French people
21st-century French people